Maria Regina College was a Catholic junior college for women in Syracuse, New York. Founded in 1934 and associated with the Sisters of the Third Order Franciscan, MC, it closed in 1990.

References

External links
 , containing founding and closing dates of Maria Regina College.
  describes the curriculum.

Defunct private universities and colleges in New York (state)
Universities and colleges in Syracuse, New York
Educational institutions established in 1934
Educational institutions disestablished in 1990
1934 establishments in New York (state)
1990 disestablishments in New York (state)